The Commercial Secretary to the Treasury is a United Kingdom Government ministerial post in HM Treasury which usually ranks at Parliamentary Under-Secretary of State level - though during Baroness Neville-Rolfe’s tenure, it was of Minister of State level. On the resignation of Lord O'Neill of Gatley in September 2016, the office ceased to be in use for three months, but Lord Young of Cookham was named to serve as Treasury spokesman in the House of Lords. The Baroness Neville-Rolfe was appointed as Commercial Secretary on 21 December 2016; her appointment ended in June 2017.

List of office holders

Colour key (for political parties):

References

HM Treasury
Finance ministers of the United Kingdom
Lists of government ministers of the United Kingdom